Talbott Teas is a Chicago based gourmet tea company owned by Jamba Juice. The company has a net profit of about $3 million. Owners Talbott and Nakisher appeared on Shark Tank, accepting a 35% equity deal with Kevin O'Leary.

Company history 

Talbott Teas was founded in 2003 by Shane Talbott and Dr. Steven Nakisher. Shane Talbott spent more than 20 years in the salon and spa industry and has served as Oprah Winfrey’s personal hair colorist for 10 years. Dr. Steven Nakisher is a psychologist and entrepreneur.

Talbott Teas created special blends for the arts and entertainment industry including for Warner Brothers' 70th anniversary of The Wizard of Oz: The Ruby Slippers Blend, the Joffrey Ballet's performances of The Nutcracker: Clara’s Tea Slippers Blend, and a gift sets for the cast and crew of Slumdog Millionaire at the 2009 Academy Awards.

Talbott won two awards for its Chocolate Almond Allure tea at the AIDS Foundation of Chicago's Annual World of Chocolate Event December 2011. In 2012, 
Talbott Teas was chosen as one of Oprah's Favorite Things.

Nakisher and Talbott appeared on Shark Tank in February 2011, receiving an investment of $250,000 for a 35 percent stake in their company from Kevin O'Leary. Subsequently, Talbott Teas was purchased by Jamba Juice in 2012.

References

External links 
 

Tea companies of the United States